Hugh Lincoln Hurd (February 11, 1925 – July 15, 1995) was an American actor and civil rights activist.  Hurd is known for his lead role in John Cassavetes' debut 1959 feature film Shadows and for his organizing activities for African-American actors.

Biography
Hugh Lincoln Hurd was born on February 11, 1925.  His most notable acting roles were as the male lead in the 1959 film Shadows directed by John Cassavetes and a major role in the Japanese film The Catch (1961), as a prisoner of war.  He also had roles in The Winner (1963), For Love of Ivy (1968), The Hot Rock (1972), Blade (1973), A Woman Under the Influence (1974), The First Deadly Sin (1980), Liebestraum (1991), Jumpin' at the Boneyard (1992), and Who's the Man? (1993). He performed other minor roles in television and commercials.  His last film appearance was in the 1995 documentary Anything for John.  Hurd performed minor theatrical roles in The Threepenny Opera, The Little Foxes, and Four Saints in Three Acts.

Hurd was active in organizing work that combated racial discrimination against African Americans in general and African-American actors in particular. In the late 1950s at the Village Gate nightclub, he co-organized with Godfrey Cambridge and Maya Angelou to fund raise $9,000 for Martin Luther King Jr. during the civil rights movement. He co-founded the Committee for the Employment of Negro Performers with Godfrey Cambridge in 1962.

In 1964, Hurd was the subject of a portrait painted by the noted artist Alice Neel. The painting is titled "Hugh Hurd" and is currently held by Crystal Bridges Museum of American Art.

Hurd died on July 15, 1995 in New York City within Greenwich Village at St. Vincent's Hospital.  According to his family, Hurd died from complications from hypertension and kidney failure.

Personal life
He married once to Dr. Merlyn Hurd with whom he had three daughters; Denise, Adrienne and Michelle Hurd, known for her roles in television series Law & Order: Special Victims Unit, Blindspot and Star Trek: Picard. He had a fourth daughter from a previous relationship.

Filmography

See also
 List of avant-garde films of the 1950s

References

Further reading

External links
 
 
 
Hugh Hurd - 1964 painting by Alice Neel held by Crystal Bridges Museum of American Art

1925 births
1995 deaths
20th-century American male actors
Place of birth missing
Male actors from New York City
American male film actors
Activists for African-American civil rights
African-American male actors
Deaths from hypertension
Deaths from kidney failure